Bozovce is a village in the municipality of Tetovo, North Macedonia.

Demographics
According to the 2021 census, the village had a total of 174 inhabitants. Ethnic groups in the village include:

Albanians 137
Others 37

Notable people from Bozovce
Lazim Destani, philanthropist and entrepreneur. Chairman of KF Shkëndija

References

External links

Villages in Tetovo Municipality
Albanian communities in North Macedonia